In mathematics — specifically, in measure theory — Malliavin's absolute continuity lemma is a result due to the French mathematician Paul Malliavin that plays a foundational rôle in the regularity (smoothness) theorems of the Malliavin calculus.  Malliavin's lemma gives a sufficient condition for a finite Borel measure to be absolutely continuous with respect to Lebesgue measure.

Statement of the lemma

Let μ be a finite Borel measure on n-dimensional Euclidean space Rn.  Suppose that, for every x ∈ Rn, there exists a constant C = C(x) such that

for every C∞ function φ : Rn → R with compact support.  Then μ is absolutely continuous with respect to n-dimensional Lebesgue measure λn on Rn.  In the above, Dφ(y) denotes the Fréchet derivative of φ at y and ||φ||∞ denotes the supremum norm of φ.

References

   (See section 1.3)
  

Lemmas in analysis
Measure theory
Paul Malliavin